Infinite Sorrow is a 1922 Soviet drama film directed by Aleksandr Panteleyev about the Russian famine of 1921.

Cast
 Pyotr Kirillov
 Ursula Krug
 Vladimir Maksimov
 Yelena Chaika
 Georgii Fedorov

External links

1922 films
Soviet black-and-white films
Soviet silent feature films
Lenfilm films
Films about famine
Soviet drama films
1922 drama films
Silent drama films